Daily Connection was a daytime news and lifestyle program produced by NBC News in collaboration with the affiliates that aired it. The program featured a mix of original reporting and content from other NBCUniversal properties, most notably the TODAY show.  Other contributing outlets included NBC News Channel, CNBC, MSNBC, The Weather Channel, Dateline, Bravo, Access Hollywood, and NBC News Mobile. Breaking local or national news was also aired.

Each broadcast's content was created by NBC News in New York, then sent to the stations, who produced the actual live broadcasts using their local anchors.  This allowed stations to give their anchors more exposure, typically replacing a syndicated daytime program with an extra half-hour of news.

The show largely avoided political stories in favor of entertainment news, health issues, strange news, and investigative reports.

It aired on several NBC-affiliated stations around the country, both owned & operated as well as independent.

It started in September 2009 on WRC in Washington and was rolled out to several other stations over the course of about a year.

The Daily Connection was last broadcast Monday July 25, 2011 after NBC News decided to pull the plug on the program.

Some NBC News reporters that were seen on the program were:

Jeff Rossen
Jenna Wolfe
Courtney Hazlett
Sara Haines
Joelle Garguilo
Kerry Sanders
Mike Taibbi
Ron Mott

Affiliates 
Monday-Friday 
WNBC-TV  12:30PM ET
KTVD-TV  11:00AM MT
KNBC-TV  12:00PM PT
WTVJ-TV  4:00PM ET
WRC-TV-DT2  7:00PM ET

External links
Official Facebook Page
WNBC's Page 
WRC's Page
KTVD's Page

NBC News
2010s American television news shows
2011 American television series endings
Tegna Inc.
NBC Owned Television Stations